The 1999 Vuelta a Castilla y León was the 14th edition of the Vuelta a Castilla y León cycle race and was held on 1 August to 5 August 1999. The race started in Valladolid and finished in Grajera. The race was won by Leonardo Piepoli.

Teams
Fifteen teams of up to eight riders started the race:

 
 
 
 
 
 
 
 
 
 
 
 
 Palmans–Ideal
 Ipso Euroclean

General classification

References

Vuelta a Castilla y León
Vuelta a Castilla y León by year
1999 in Spanish sport